The Worcester Cold Storage and Warehouse Co. fire began on December 3, 1999, in a 93-year-old abandoned building at 266 Franklin Street, Worcester, Massachusetts. The fire was started accidentally some time between 4:30–5:45pm by two homeless people (Thomas Levesque and Julie Ann Barnes) who were squatting in the building and had knocked over a candle. They left the scene without reporting the fire. The 6-story building, previously used as a meat cold storage facility, had no windows above the ground floor and no fire detection or suppression systems. The fire, which started on the second story, burned undetected for 30–90 minutes.

The structure was located five blocks east of the Worcester central business district, near Union Station and adjacent to Interstate 290. An off-duty police officer first called in the fire at 6:13pm after noticing grey/white smoke coming from the roof of the building. At around the same time an off-duty firefighter from neighbouring Auburn passed the building on I-290 and radioed his Fire Control to report smoke coming from the roof. He told them to inform the Fire Chief "this is going to be a multiple-alarm fire."

Firefighters were unfamiliar with the layout of the building, and most of the floors inside — each up to  — were divided into a labyrinth of connecting meat lockers. The walls and many ceilings were covered with insulating layers of cork, tar, expanded polystyrene foam, and spray-applicated polyurethane foam. There were no fire walls or fire doors, and only a single staircase extended from the basement to the roof.

The owner of a neighboring business informed a police officer at the scene that a homeless couple had been squatting in the building and firefighters initiated a search, believing they could still be trapped inside. Conditions inside the building deteriorated rapidly. Worcester Fire Department District Chief Michael McNamee said: "There was a light smoke condition in the upper levels of the building to the point we didn't even have our face pieces on. Within four seconds it went from that condition to the building being filled completely with black, hot, boiling smoke." The layout of the building and the absence of windows left firefighters without a secondary escape route and prevented ladder and rescue operations. Six firefighters were still unaccounted for in the building when the interior floors collapsed to the second story level. They were the city's first firefighting deaths in 36 years.

Worcester Cold Storage and Warehouse Co.
The Worcester Cold Storage and Warehouse Co. building was constructed in 1906 and covered an entire city block on Franklin Street. The warehouse was built to store western dressed beef from cattle slaughtered in the stock yards of Chicago, which could be shipped east in refrigerated rail cars at a lower cost than shipping livestock. The interior consisted of six storage levels and a basement. The warehouse was served by a rail siding to the rear, operated by the Boston and Albany Railroad.

To insulate the building, it was constructed with  brick walls and had no windows above the first floor, except in the stairwell. The interior walls were covered with layers of cork impregnated with tar, polystyrene foam and polyurethane to improve insulation. Two elevator shafts ran alongside the stairwell. The first and second story floors were constructed of concrete, and those above were constructed of timber. In 1912, the building was extended on the west side. The extension almost doubled the floor space and included two further elevators serving all levels, a second stairwell which terminated at the 3rd floor, and some windows in an office space on the north-east corner of the 2nd floor.

Between 1906 and 1983, the building was owned by the Worcester Cold Storage and Warehouse Co. In 1983, it was sold to Chicago Dressed Beef. It was purchased by CDB Realty Trust, controlled by Ding On "Tony" Kwan and his wife Shu May Kwan, in 1987. The building was abandoned by 1989 and remained vacant until its destruction, though Kwan had proposed several re-use cases for the property. During this period, it was frequently used by homeless persons, who built fires inside for warmth.

Fire 
Reports that homeless people were possibly inside the engulfed warehouse caused fire-rescue personnel to search the six-story building. The searchers' task was made extremely difficult by the large size of the building's interior, the layout, which was a maze of corridors and meat lockers, many with identical flush-handle doors, and the highly flammable composition of its insulation. Nearly a century old, the interior walls had been progressively covered with various forms of insulating materials, including cork impregnated with tar, polystyrene foam, and polyurethane foam, to a thickness of 18 inches.  Once ignited, the large amount of fuel, fed initially by the large volume of air in the building, became virtually inextinguishable.

The six-story building's exterior walls were constructed of approximately 18 inches of brick and mortar, with no windows above the second floor.  The lack of available windows prevented firefighting personnel from making an accurate initial assessment of the fire.  Initial breaching of lower-floor doors, combined with venting the building by smashing an elevator-shaft roof skylight, effectively turned the building into a huge chimney.  With the fire rapidly accelerating out of control, rescue teams facing near-zero visibility became lost with available breathing air depleted.  Despite repeated radio calls for help, along with activation of audible location alarms, six firefighters perished in the blaze. It took eight days to find and recover the remains of the six men.

Timeline

Deaths

These are known as the "Worcester Six".

 Lyons and Jackson both received a posthumous promotion from Firefighter to Lieutenant.

Criminal charges
Involuntary manslaughter charges against Levesque and Barnes were initially dismissed, reinstated on appeal, and finally dismissed in January 2010. They received probation.  Ding On "Tony" Kwan, the building's owner, was not charged, but families of the deceased firefighters sued him for wrongful death for negligently failing to keep out squatters. The families received between $166,667 and $250,000 each from Kwan in out-of-court settlements.

Memorials

A memorial service and procession for the firefighters were held in Worcester's Centrum Centre on December 9, 1999. The service was broadcast on several national news networks and was attended by President Bill Clinton, Vice President Al Gore, Senator Ted Kennedy and Senator John Kerry (who flew non-stop from Burma, where he had been attending a diplomatic function). Also in the procession were firefighters from around the United States, Canada, and from Dublin, Ireland. The Boston Stock Exchange suspended business at 11:00am during the memorial and observed a minute's silence while a bell was rung in tribute on the trading floor.

City leaders planned to erect a memorial to the men in Institute Park, adjacent to  the Worcester Fire Headquarters station on Grove Street. The Franklin Street Fire Station, officially opened November 19, 2008, now sits on the land formerly occupied by the cold storage facility, which was demolished immediately after the fire investigation. A memorial to the fallen firefighters, created by artist Brian P. Hanlon, is also located at this site. Also, a banner hangs from the rafters in the DCU Center to commemorate the Worcester 6; it was raised by the Worcester Sharks AHL team on December 3, 2009. 

On November 12, 2019, the then-new Triple-A affiliate of Major League Baseball's Boston Red Sox, the Worcester Red Sox, announced they would preemptively retire uniform number 6 in honor of the six men who died. Additionally, the team sells jerseys featuring "Worcester 6" on the back, with portion of the proceeds going to a memorial care fund.

Leary Firefighters Foundation
Actor and comedian Denis Leary's first cousin, Jerry Lucey, and his childhood friend and high school classmate, Lieutenant Tommy Spencer, were both victims of the fire. Leary established The Leary Firefighters Foundation in the spring of 2000. In October 2000, Leary held the first "Celebrity Hat Trick" fundraiser including a hockey game, a golf tournament and a dinner. The hockey game was played at Worcester Centrum between a "Hollywood" team, including Michael J. Fox, Kiefer Sutherland, Tim Robbins and Rick Moranis, and a Boston Bruins Alumni Team, coached by Bobby Orr and including Phil Esposito, Johnny Bucyk, Derek Sanderson and Cam Neely. The hockey game raised $350,000 and became an annual event. The proceeds went to Worcester and central Massachusetts fire departments to fund equipment, technology, and training, and to the families of firefighters who died or were injured in the line of duty.

Film adaptation
In July 2000, journalist Sean Flynn's article about the fire, "The Perfect Fire", was published in Esquire magazine. Flynn's subsequent book, 3000 Degrees: The True Story of a Deadly Fire and The Men Who Fought It, was published in 2002.

Warner Bros. planned to use the book as the basis for a movie, with a screenplay written by Scott Silver, a Worcester native. Director Michael Mann was attached to the project, but left in February 2003, possibly as a result of the "slow-moving pre-production process." In September 2003, Warner Bros. hired director Danny Boyle to shoot the project, provisionally titled Worcester Cold Storage. Filming was expected to begin in early 2004 with an autumn 2004 release date.

Filming was scheduled to begin May 10, 2004, in Toronto, with Ed Harris and Woody Harrelson signed to star in the movie. Firefighters across North America protested that it was insensitive to make a film about fallen firefighters while their children were still young, and Worcester Fire Fighters IAFF Local 1009 wrote to other firefighters asking them not to participate in the movie's production. This resulted in the production company being unable to procure agreements in the United States or Canada to allow the use of firefighter insignia, while Canadian firefighters refused to act as extras and fire departments in the Toronto metropolitan area refused to lease firetrucks to the company.

In late April 2004, Warner Bros. and Image Entertainment, the production company, issued a joint statement saying that the making of a film the size and scope of Worcester Cold Storage was "a complex process that needed the support of various groups and individuals, including firefighters. Due to circumstances beyond our control, we no longer have such support. We have therefore decided not to move ahead with this project at this time." Frank Raffa, president of Local 1009, responded that firefighters "may one day drop their opposition" to the movie, "But we want to wait until the kids of our fallen comrades grow up."

Ladder 49
The 2004 movie Ladder 49, directed by Jay Russell, told the story of a fictional Baltimore firefighter who is trapped inside a warehouse fire, and his recollection of the events that got him to that point. The film, starring Joaquin Phoenix and John Travolta, was based on the events of the Worcester fire. The Boston Herald wrote:

See also

List of the deadliest firefighter disasters in the United States

References

Further reading

External links

1999 fires in the United States
1999 in Massachusetts
Fires in Massachusetts
Building and structure fires in the United States
History of Worcester, Massachusetts
Warehouse fires
December 1999 events in the United States
Cool warehouses
Building collapses in 1999
Building collapses in Massachusetts
Building collapses caused by fire